Alison Dunhill (born 1950) is an English artist and art historian, and also a published poet.

Biography
Born in London, Dunhill trained in Fine Art at the University of Reading under Sir Terry Frost and Rita Donagh. In the early 1970s she had a studio in Florence where she associated with some of the key figures in the Situationist International, including philosopher and filmmaker Guy Debord, the writer Gianfranco Sanguinetti and, later, the novelist and critic Michèle Bernstein. She presented some of her recollections of that time to an audience in Rio de Janeiro in 2015.

Artistic career
Dunhill was primarily a landscape painter in her earlier career, and later explored more abstract and semi-sculptural forms, including mixed media artworks inspired by the surrealist ideas of chance and the found object.

For much of her artistic career Dunhill maintained studios in London but she now lives and works in King's Lynn, Norfolk. She has exhibited frequently; she is a Member of the National Society of Painters, Sculptors & Printmakers; and she was a founder member of the Kingsgate Workshops Trust.

One of her drawings selected from the Women Artists Slide Library (WASL) was reproduced in The Women Artists Diary 1989. Three of her paintings, and a discussion of the techniques she used to create them from her own original photographs, were reproduced in Diana Constance's book on painting from photographs published in 1995.

In 2015 she was awarded a residency at Largo das Artes (Despina), a contemporary art institute in Rio de Janeiro, Brazil.

In July 2019 she presented new works and site-specific installations with CUSP Artists at the Undercroft Gallery in Norwich.

Returning to landscape painting in her 2021 'Lockdown Landscape' exhibition, Dunhill presented some 20 new canvases, of varying sizes from 30 x 30 cm up to 100 x 140 cm, painted with acrylics and mostly without brushes, as her response to the changed and changing world of the COVID-19 lockdown. Her account of the effect of the lockdown on her art practice is published in Now This: Reflections on Our Arts and Cultures.

Selected solo exhibitions
 1984 - Kingsgate Gallery, London
 1990 - Piers Feetham Gallery, London
 1992 - Hampstead Theatre Gallery, London
 1994 - Piers Feetham Gallery, London
 1995 - Hampstead Theatre Gallery, London
 1998 - Incomes Data Services, London
 2003 - 'Segments', Gallery 47, London
 2007 - Neptune Gallery, Hunstanton
 2012 - Greyfriars Art Space, King's Lynn
 2013 - Flow Films, London
 2015 - Largo das Artes, Rio de Janeiro
 2018 - Fermoy Gallery, King's Lynn
 2019 - 'Upscape', A/side-B/side Gallery, London
 2021 - 'Lockdown Landscape', Fermoy Gallery, King's Lynn
(Selected from exhibition list on artist's website)

Art historian
As an art historian, Dunhill completed an MPhil thesis at the University of Essex on the modernist American photographer Francesca Woodman. This thesis provides a detailed analysis of the six photographic books that Woodman compiled in her lifetime, and examines them in the context of surrealism which, Dunhill argues, was a significant influence on Woodman. Her study of Woodman's book Some Disordered Interior Geometries was published in re•bus in 2008. Dunhill has presented papers on Woodman at academic conferences and gallery talks at the Douglas Hyde Gallery at Trinity College Dublin and the Sainsbury Centre for Visual Arts.

She contributed a memoir to a 2010 Paris exhibition catalogue of the artist and psychogeographer, and sometime Situationist, Ralph Rumney, whom she had befriended in the latter years of his life; and her published reviews include an assessment of Claudia Herstatt's Women Gallerists for Tate Etc. She also reviewed Anna Anderson's Childhood Rituals exhibition at the Freud Museum in Hampstead in 2011 for Cassone: The International Online Magazine of Art and Art Books.

Poetry
Dunhill's early poetry collection, Gig Soup Scoop, published in 1972 by a small alternative press, is now a rarity. She was an Arvon Foundation mentee in 1991, leading to publication in Joe Soap's Canoe.

More recently, two of her prose poems were long-listed for the Fish Publishing Flash Fiction Prize 2020. Also in that year two of her poems were published in the international online surrealist poetry SurVision Magazine. Two further poems of hers were included in the Fenland Poetry Journal; the cover art of this issue reproduces one of Dunhill's artworks.

Her poetry pamphlet As Pure as Coal Dust, a winner of the James Tate International Poetry Prize, was published by SurVision Books in June 2021.

References

External links
 

1950 births
Living people
20th-century English painters
21st-century English painters
20th-century English women artists
21st-century English women artists
20th-century English women writers
21st-century English women writers
Alumni of the University of Essex
Alumni of the University of Reading
Artists from London
British abstract artists
British women historians
English art historians
English landscape painters
English women painters
Women art historians